Anolis etheridgei, also known commonly as Etheridge's anole and the montane bush anole, is a species of lizard in the family Dactyloidae. The species is endemic to 
the Dominican Republic.

Etymology
The specific name, etheridgei, is in honor of American herpetologist Richard Emmett Etheridge.

Geographic range
A. etheridgei occurs in the Cordillera Central, Dominican Republic.

Habitat

Description
The tail is long, more than twice SVL. The dewlap is small and white, and the iris of the eye is blue.

Diet
A. etheridgei preys upon invertebrates.

Reproduction
A. etheridgei is oviparous.

References

Further reading
Mahler DL (2010). "Natural history observations for two montane anole species from the Dominican Republic". (Anolis etheridgei, pp. 115–117).
Schwartz A, Henderson RW (1991). Amphibians and Reptiles of the West Indies: Descriptions, Distributions, and Natural History. Gainesville: University of Florida Press. 720 pp. . (Anolis etheridgei, p. 259).
Schwartz A, Thomas R (1975). A Check-list of West Indian Amphibians and Reptiles. Carnegie Museum of Natural History Special Publication No. 1. Pittsburgh, Pennsylvania: Carnegie Museum of Natural History. 216 pp. (Anolis etheridgei, p. 82).
Williams EE (1962). "Notes on the herpetology of Hispaniola. 7. New material of two poorly known anoles: Anolis monticola Shreve and Anolis christophei Williams". Breviora (164): 1–11. (Anolis etheridgei, new name, p. 1).

Anoles
Endemic fauna of the Dominican Republic
Reptiles of the Dominican Republic
Reptiles described in 1962
Taxa named by Ernest Edward Williams